Brain fever describes a medical condition where a part of the brain becomes inflamed and causes symptoms that present as fever. The terminology is dated and is encountered most often in Victorian literature, where it typically describes a potentially life-threatening illness brought about by a severe emotional upset.

Conditions
Conditions that may be described as brain fever include:
Encephalitis, an acute inflammation of the brain, commonly caused by a viral infection.
Meningitis, the inflammation of the membranes covering the brain and spinal cord.
Cerebritis, inflammation of the cerebrum.
Scarlet fever, infectious disease whose symptoms can include paranoia and hallucinations.

Definition
The definition, when inferred from the literature refers to an acute nervous breakdown and/or temporary insanity, due to extreme emotional distress.
Often with associated psychosomatic illness or fever like symptoms.

In popular culture
The term is used in Alexandre Dumas's The Count of Monte Cristo (1844) and Emily Brontë's Wuthering Heights (1847.)

In "The Wound Dresser", by Walt Whitman, the part called Letters of 1864 (about 3/4 of the way through the book), VI, a letter dated March 15, 1861, describes a patient Whitman lost to brain fever.

In Elizabeth Gaskell's novel Cousin Phillis (1863–1864), the main female character Phillis Holman suffers from a sudden attack of brain fever upon hearing that her lover has married someone else. 

In Arthur Conan Doyle's Sherlock Holmes story "The Crooked Man", the term is used to describe a woman in a state of shock when her husband has been murdered. The term is also used in "The Naval Treaty", in The Memoirs of Sherlock Holmes; here it refers to Percy Phelps, an old schoolmate of Dr. Watson's, who was distraught after losing important diplomatic papers. He becomes so upset that, while travelling home after leaving the case with the police, he reports becoming "practically a raving maniac". Phelps, "lay for over nine weeks, unconscious, and raving mad with brain fever", before recovering enough to send for the aid of Dr Watson's friend Sherlock Holmes. Similarly, characters with brain fever are also mentioned in the Holmes stories "The Adventure of the Copper Beeches", "The Adventure of the Cardboard Box", and "The Adventure of the Musgrave Ritual".

Brain fever is also mentioned in Bram Stoker's Dracula, where Jonathan Harker has brain fever after escaping from the Count.

Brain fever is mentioned in Dostoyevsky's The Brothers Karamazov, which manifests itself into Ivan's nightmare of the devil: "Anticipating events I can say at least one thing: he was at that moment on the very eve of an attack of brain fever. Though his health had long been affected, it had offered a stubborn resistance to the fever which in the end gained complete mastery over it."

The Indian Gentleman, Mr Carrisford, in Francis Hodgson Burnett's A Little Princess, and Captain Crewe, Sarah's father, both experience brain fever when they think their investments in the diamond mines have become worthless.

Rena, the main character of House Behind the Cedars (Charles W Chesnutt, published 1900) is afflicted with brain fever in her final moments, with symptoms including delirium and hallucinations. 

A technician accuses a robot of having "brain-fever" in Isaac Asimov's 1945 short story "Escape", included in the 1950 collection I, Robot.

Brain fever is mentioned in Squire Toby's Will by Joseph Sheridan Le Fanu.

In the season 2 Daria episode "Ill", Jane explains the reason for Daria's hospital stay as brain fever, saying, "It's a thing that brains get....usually if you just read a best-seller it'll go away."

Brain fever is also mentioned in the 2012 video game Dishonored, as one of the supporting characters, Piero Joplin, is said to have it at times.

In The Way of All Flesh by Samuel Butler, Ernest develops brain fever after being sent to prison for sexual assault.

See also
Brain-fever bird (common hawk-cuckoo, Cuculus varius), so called from its call
Nervous breakdown

References

Fever
Brain disorders